Blåhøe is a mountain in Skjåk Municipality in Innlandet county, Norway. The mountain is surrounded by several other notable mountains including Dørkampen and Høggøymen to the northwest, Digerkampen to the north, Holhøi to the northeast, Gråhø to the east, Skarvedalseggen and Nørdre Svarthaugen to the southeast, and Stamåhjulet to the south.

On the top of the mountain located the Jettasenderen transmitter that is fed from the Tronsenderen in Alvdal. It transmits telecommunications, as well as TV and radio signals, both digital and analogue, directly or via converters to approx. 35,000 inhabitants and approx. 40,000 cabins in the municipalities of Skjåk, Lom, Vågå, Lesja, Dovre, Sel, Nord-Fron, Sør-Fron, Ringebu and parts of Øyer.

See also
List of mountains of Norway

References

Skjåk
Mountains of Innlandet